The AEG J.I was a German biplane ground attack aircraft of 1917, an armored and more powerful version of the AEG C.IV reconnaissance aircraft.

Design and development
The AEG J.I was a two-seat single-engined tractor biplane with a conventional landing gear with a tail skid. The aircraft was constructed using fabric covered steel tubes. The open tandem cockpit for the pilot and gunner had armour protection . The gunner had three weapons, two 7.92 mm (.312 in) LMG 08/15 machine guns were fitted to the floor of the cockpit for ground targets. One 7.92 mm (.312 in) Parabellum MG14 machine gun was on a rotable mounting.

Aircraft fitted with ailerons on the lower wing as well as the upper wing were designated AEG J.Ia.

An improved version of the J.I was developed as the AEG J.II, which had aerodynamically balanced ailerons with overhanging horn balances, extended rear fuselage with a larger fin to improve directional stability and a re-located aileron link strut.

After the war, several J.IIs served the first sustained daily passenger aeroplane service in the world, between Berlin and Weimar, flown by Deutsche Luft-Reederei. This route began on 5 February 1919. Early commercial J.II's retained open cockpits, but modified versions with enclosed cabins for the two passengers quickly replaced them.

Variants

AEG J.I
An armoured version of the AEG C.IV fitted with downward pointing machine guns in the floor of the rear cockpit for ground strafing and a defensive hand-aimed machine-gun in the observers cockpit.
AEG J.Ia
The J.Ia version featured aileron controls on the lower wings, in addition to the upper.
AEG J.II
Structurally similar to the J.I the J.II introduced ailerons aerodynamically balanced by large horn extensions at the wing-tips, increased fin area to improve directional stability and a re-located aileron link strut.

Operators

Luftstreitkräfte
 Deutsche Luft-Reederei

Specifications (AEG J.I)

See also

References

Bibliography

Probably Villeselve, France. 19 April 1918. The tangled wreckage of a crashed AEG J I aircraft of a German squadron, probably Bayrische Flieger Abteilung 287 (Bavarian Flying Section 287), in a field. Leutnant Major Vizefeldwebel Benz was killed in this crash.

J.I
Single-engined tractor aircraft
Biplanes
1910s German attack aircraft
Aircraft first flown in 1917